Gustavo Santos Simões da Silva (born 23 April 2002), known as Gustavo Santos or just Gustavo, is a Brazilian footballer who plays as a forward for Avaí.

Club career
Born in Praia Grande, São Paulo, Gustavo represented Matonense and Vasco da Gama before joining Avaí's youth setup in 2020. He made his first team debut with the latter on 7 April 2021, coming on as a second-half substitute and scoring the winner in a 1–0 Campeonato Catarinense home success over Joinville.

After another two first team appearances, Gustavo subsequently returned to the under-20s, and was promoted back to the first team after the 2022 Copa São Paulo de Futebol Júnior. On 21 March 2022, he renewed his contract with the club until 2025.

Gustavo made his Série A debut on 3 July 2022, replacing Eduardo in a 2–1 home loss against Cuiabá.

Career statistics

Honours
Avaí
Campeonato Catarinense: 2021

References

External links
Avaí profile 

2002 births
Living people
Footballers from São Paulo (state)
Brazilian footballers
Association football forwards
Campeonato Brasileiro Série A players
Avaí FC players
People from Praia Grande